Anastasiia Ivanova (born 21 March 1990) is a Russian foil fencer.

She participated at the 2019 World Fencing Championships, winning a goldmedal with the Russian team.

References

External links

1990 births
Living people
Russian female foil fencers
Fencers at the 2015 European Games
European Games medalists in fencing
European Games gold medalists for Russia